The Story of Two Women is a 1994 South Korean film directed by Lee Jung-gook. It was awarded Best Film at the Grand Bell Awards ceremony. Other awards won by the film included Best New Director for Lee, Best Screenplay and Best New Actress for Yoon Yoo-sun.

Plot
This drama depicts the difficult lives of women in the post-Korean War era.

Cast
Kim Seo-ra
Yoon Yoo-sun
Jung Dong-hwan
Kim Hee-ra
Nam Su-jung
Kim Bok-hee
Kim Jae-seong

Bibliography

References

External links

Best Picture Grand Bell Award winners
1990s Korean-language films
South Korean drama films